Albești-Paleologu is a commune in Prahova County, Muntenia, Romania. It is composed of four villages: Albești-Muru, Albești-Paleologu, Cioceni and Vadu Părului.

The commune is located in the south-central part of the county, on the banks of the river Cricovul Sărat.

References

Communes in Prahova County
Localities in Muntenia